Kowalewko may refer to the following places:
Kowalewko, Kuyavian-Pomeranian Voivodeship (north-central Poland)
Kowalewko, Ciechanów County in Masovian Voivodeship (east-central Poland)
Kowalewko, Mława County in Masovian Voivodeship (east-central Poland)
Kowalewko, Płock County in Masovian Voivodeship (east-central Poland)
Kowalewko, Gniezno County in Greater Poland Voivodeship (west-central Poland)
Kowalewko, Oborniki County in Greater Poland Voivodeship (west-central Poland)